The 2019 Le Samyn des Dames was the sixth running of the women's Le Samyn, a women's bicycle race in Hainaut, Belgium. It was held on 5 March 2019 over a distance of  starting in Quaregnon and finishing in Dour. It was rated by the UCI as a 1.2 category race.

Result

Source

References

See also
 2019 in women's road cycling

Le Samyn des Dames
Le Samyn des Dames
Le Samyn des Dames